Wittrockia spiralipetala is a plant species in the genus Wittrockia.

The bromeliad is endemic to the Atlantic Forest biome (Mata Atlantica Brasileira) and to Rio de Janeiro state, located in southeastern Brazil.

References

spiralipetala
Endemic flora of Brazil
Flora of Rio de Janeiro (state)
Flora of the Atlantic Forest